The Gros Ventre Range is part of the Central Rocky Mountains and is located west of the Continental Divide in U.S. state of Wyoming. The Gros Ventre Range is mostly within the Gros Ventre Wilderness of Bridger–Teton National Forest. To the northwest of the range lies the valley known as Jackson Hole. Snow King ski resort is in the range adjacent to the town of Jackson, Wyoming. Also in the Gros Ventre Range is the Gros Ventre landslide, which in 1925 slid down the north slope of Sheep Mountain.

Tallest peaks in the range 
1. Doubletop Peak 
2. Black Peak 
3. Darwin Peak 
4. Antoinette Peak 
5. Tosi Peak 
6. Sheep Mountain 
7. Gros Peak 
8. Pinnacle Peak 
9. Jackson Peak 
10. Mount Leidy

Cited references

Landforms of Teton County, Wyoming
Ranges of the Rocky Mountains
Bridger–Teton National Forest
Mountain ranges of Wyoming